Cercivento is a comune (municipality) in the Province of Udine in the Italian region Friuli-Venezia Giulia, located about  northwest of Trieste and about  northwest of Udine.

Cercivento borders the following municipalities: Paluzza, Ravascletto, Sutrio.

References

Cities and towns in Friuli-Venezia Giulia